This is a list of football clubs in Finland.

League listings

 Championship – Veikkausliiga
 Division 1 – Ykkönen
 Division 2 – Kakkonen
 Division 3 – Kolmonen 
 Division 4 – Nelonen  
 Division 5 – Vitonen
 Division 6 – Kutonen
 Division 7 – Seiska

Alphabetical listings 

Contents: A  B  C  D  E  F  G  H  I  J  K  L  M  N  O  P  Q  R  S  T  U  V  W  X  Y  Z  Å  Ä  Ö

C

Footnotes

References 

C